Leokadiya Mikhailovna Drobizheva (Russian:Леокáдия Михáйловна Дро́бижева)  (13 January 1933 – 11 April 2021) was a Russian sociologist. She was made an Honored Scientist of the Russian Federation in 1999, Laureate of the Prize of the President of the Russian Federation for Contribution to Strengthening the Unity of the Russian Nation (2019), and Honorary Doctor of the Institute of Sociology of the Russian Academy of Sciences.

References

Russian sociologists
1933 births
2021 deaths
Russian women sociologists
Honoured Scientists of the Russian Federation
20th-century Russian women
Academic staff of the Higher School of Economics